County Hall is a municipal facility in Marine Road, Dún Laoghaire in the county of Dún Laoghaire–Rathdown, Ireland.

History
The building, which was designed by John Loftus Robinson in the Lombard Romanesque style, was completed in 1879. It was intended to contain the local municipal offices, a public hall and a large courthouse under one roof and went on to become the home of the Corporation of Dún Laoghaire on its formation in 1930. It was extensively refurbished in 1990 and, following the implementation of the Local Government (Dublin) Act 1993, it became the headquarters of Dún Laoghaire–Rathdown County Council. Subsequently renamed County Hall, it benefited from a further refurbishment at a cost of €3 million in 2017.

References

Buildings and structures in Dún Laoghaire–Rathdown
Dún Laoghaire